This is a list of awards and nominations received by South Korean singer Lee Hyori.


Awards and nominations

Other accolades

State and cultural honors

Listicles

References 

Lee Hyori